Zelia is a feminine given name. People named Zelia or Zélia include:

 Zealia Bishop (1897–1968), sometimes spelled Zelia, American short story writer
 Zelia N. Breaux (1880–1956), African-American music instructor and musician
 Zélia Cardoso de Mello (born 1953), Brazilian economist, Minister of the Economy from 1990 to 1991
 Zélia Duncan (born 1964), Brazilian singer and composer
 Zélia Gattai (1916–2008), Brazilian photographer, memoirist, novelist and author of children's literature
 Zelia Hoffman (1867–1929), American horticulturalist and British politician
 Zelia Nuttall (1857–1933), American archaeologist and anthropologist
 Zelia Ball Page (1850–1937), African-American teacher, first matron of Langston University and mother of Zelia Breaux
 Zelia Peet Ruebhausen (1914–1990), American civic leader and policy advisor
 Zelia Trebelli-Bettini (1836–1892), also known as Zelia Gilbert, French operatic mezzo-soprano

Feminine given names